Smin may refer to:

People
 Smin Sam Lek (1340–1388), Burmese viceroy
 Smin Bayan, Burmese commander

Places
 Smin, Bulgaria
 Smin Peak, Antarctica

Other
 SMIN or Smiths Group

See also
 Smen